Guémar is a commune in the Haut-Rhin department in Grand Est in north-eastern France.

See also
Communes of the Haut-Rhin département
Leo Jud

References

External links

Communes of Haut-Rhin